Malaya Tina Bandico Watson (born September 24, 1997) is an American singer from Southfield, Michigan, who finished in eighth place on the thirteenth season of American Idol.

Early life
Watson is of half-Filipino American and half-African-American descent, the daughter of Ronald Watson, a professional guitar player, and Marian Bandico Watson, a nurse who hails from Manila, Philippines. In high school, she played the tuba in Southfield High School marching band.  She is an alumna of the Mosaic Youth Theater of Detroit, where she sang in Singsation and Hasting Street. She is also an alumna of the Michigan Opera Theatre Children's Chorus., where she starred in Carmen, Tosca, Pied Piper of Hamlin, The Very Last Green Thing and The Nut Cracker.

Musical influences
She cites her two grandfathers and her father as her personal musical influences. She described her style in singing from Sly Stone and Beyoncé.

Career

2014: American Idol

At 15, Watson auditioned in Detroit with Aretha Franklin's "Ain't No Way." She is the third youngest contestant in American Idol's history to reach the live finals after Lauren Alaina and Daniel Seavey.

After being deemed as a front-runner to win by judge Jennifer Lopez and fans, Watson was announced as the act with lowest number of votes for Top 8 reveal night. With the Judges save gone, Malaya was eliminated from the competition. She sang "I Am Changing" as her farewell song. After her final performance Watson received a final standing ovation from all three judges.

Performances on American Idol

Post Idol
Watson took part in the American Idols Live! Tour 2014 from June 24 through August 24, 2014. Throughout the duration of tour and to date, she worked on her debut EP, My Diary, and her unnamed album.

Watson sang the U.S. national anthem at the Detroit Lions versus New Orleans Saints game at Ford Field in Detroit on October 19, 2014.

In 2018, Watson released her debut single, "Time.", and released her second single "Worry About Myself" two years later in 2020. Later in the year, she appeared on Terrace Martin, Robert Glasper, 9th Wonder and Kamasi Washington's collaborative EP Dinner Party: Dessert, contributing guest vocals to the song "Love You Bad" with Phoelix.

On December 4, 2020, Watson released her debut EP, My Diary: The Prelude.. This was followed by her sophomore EP Father's Law, which was released the following year. Later that same year, Malaya would appear on the Terrace Martin album Drones, contributing vocals to "Evil Eye" with rapper YG. She also appeared on 2 tracks from Snoop Dogg's compilation Algorithm.

Discography

EPs
My Diary: The Prelude (2020)
Father's Law (2021)

Digital singles (American Idol)

Singles

Guest appearances

References

1997 births
21st-century American singers
American Idol participants
Living people
21st-century African-American women singers
American musicians of Filipino descent
People from Southfield, Michigan
Singers from Michigan
21st-century American women singers